Ava is a 2020 American action thriller film directed by Tate Taylor written by Matthew Newton and produced by Chastain's production company, Freckle Films. The film stars Jessica Chastain, John Malkovich, Common, Geena Davis, Colin Farrell, Ioan Gruffudd and Joan Chen.

Ava premiered on Budapest on June 2, 2020, and in the United States through DirecTV Cinema on August 27, 2020, followed by a limited theatrical and video on demand release on September 25, 2020, by Vertical Entertainment. The film received generally negative reviews, but Chastain's performance received some praise.

Plot
Ava Faulkner (Jessica Chastain) is a recovering addict and former soldier turned assassin. In France, she kidnaps her new target, an English businessman. Before she kills him, she questions him on why someone wants him dead. Unbeknownst to her, another woman electronically eavesdrops on the conversation. Afterwards, Ava flies to Boston where she visits with her estranged sister Judy and her mother Bobbi who is hospitalized for angina pain. Ava has not seen them in eight years.

Ava's handler and former Army superior, Duke, sends her to Saudi Arabia to kill a German general. Ava lures the general into a trap and injects him with a poison to make it appear he died of a heart attack. She is interrupted by the general's security guards. A gunfight ensues, leaving all the men dead.

Ava escapes and travels to Barneville-Carteret where Duke apologizes for the botched operation, insisting that the bad intel was a simple mistake. He gives her time off to decompress and she returns to Boston and meets Michael, her former fiancé who is now in a relationship with her sister Judy.

In British Columbia, Duke meets with his superior, Simon.  Simon's daughter Camille is the woman who had earlier eavesdropped on Ava's hit. Simon believes Ava is a liability and that her questioning of targets demonstrates insufficient commitment to their operation.  After Duke leaves, Simon reaffirms the hit on Ava.  She kills her attacker and then confronts Duke who insists that it was a random drug addict attack. That night, Ava goes to dinner with Judy and Michael but their conversation does not go well. The next morning, Judy meets Ava and tells her Michael is missing. Realizing he has started gambling again, Ava rescues him from a gambling den run by a woman, Toni, to whom Michael is indebted.

Duke revisits Simon and reveals he knew Ava was set up. A fight ensues between the two men, resulting in Simon killing Duke. He sends a video of Duke's death to Ava. A heartbroken Ava goes to Judy's house, where she invites Michael to run away with her but he declines, revealing that Judy is pregnant. Ava heads to Toni's den where she kills some of her men before giving Toni a bag of money to pay off Michael's debt. Ava starts to strangle Toni, and is about to break her neck, but then changes her mind, letting her live while warning her to stay away from Michael.

Back at her hotel, Ava is attacked by Simon. They fight, with both sustaining serious injuries. Exhausted, Simon flees when the fire alarm goes off, warning Ava that he will kill her if he sees her again.  Ava pursues Simon, cornering and killing him under the Zakim Bridge. Ava goes to her sister's house, warning Judy to leave the country and giving her the number to a Swiss bank account filled with Ava's earnings. Before she leaves, Michael gives her a letter from Duke, who says that he is happy with how his life turned out. As she walks down the street, Ava is stalked by Simon's daughter, Camille.

Cast
 Jessica Chastain as Ava Faulkner 
 John Malkovich as Duke
 Common as Michael, Ava's ex-fiancé and Judy’s fiancé
 Colin Farrell as Simon
 Geena Davis as Bobbi, Ava's mother
 Jess Weixler as Judy, Ava's sister
 Diana Silvers as Camille, Simon's daughter
 Joan Chen as Toni
 Ioan Gruffudd as Peter Hamilton, financial advisor to the International Monetary Fund

Production
In August 2018, the production drew criticism due to Matthew Newton, who at the time was set to direct, having been accused of multiple allegations of assault and domestic violence. In addition to the accusations, he had also pleaded guilty to assaulting Brooke Satchwell, his then girlfriend. Jessica Chastain, a vocal advocate for the MeToo movement, was accused of hypocrisy for working with Newton. Newton would ultimately step down from directing the film, with Tate Taylor hired to replace him. Newton is credited as the film's writer.

In September 2018, Colin Farrell, Common, and John Malkovich joined the cast of the film. In October 2018, Christopher Domig, Diana Silvers, Geena Davis, Joan Chen, and Jess Weixler joined the cast of the film. In November 2019, it was announced the film had been re-titled Ava.

Filming
Principal photography began on September 24, 2018, in Boston, and was filmed in Boston, Gloucester, and Weston, Massachusetts, USA. Filming locations included Saint Joseph's Abbey, The Schrafft Center, Wingaersheek Beach, Worcester Regional Airport, Boston Public Market, and Boston Common.

Release
The film was released in Hungary on July 2, 2020. It was released in the United States through DirecTV Cinema on August 27, 2020, followed by video on demand on September 25, 2020, by Vertical Entertainment. It received a DVD and Blu-ray release in Australia on September 2, 2020, by Madman Entertainment.

It began streaming on Netflix on December 6, 2020. It was the third most-watched film on the site on its first day of release and finished first in its second day. It went on to become the top-streamed film over its first weekend.

Reception

Critical response
The website's critics consensus reads, "Ava seems to have all the components of an entertaining spy thriller, but not even this spectacular cast is enough to salvage the dull, clichéd story they're given to work with." On Metacritic, the film has a weighted average score of 39 out of 100, based on nine critics, indicating "generally unfavorable reviews".

Guy Lodge of Variety wrote that "the film provides an adequate showcase for its producer-star's unexpected prowess as an action hero — yet Matthew Newton's skimpy, dial-a-cliché script makes the whole enterprise feel more like a mid-range series pilot than a major star vehicle." Writing for The Hollywood Reporter Boyd van Hoeij said that "Chastain is utterly convincing in another tough-as-nails role. If audiences stick with the movie, it's largely thanks to her movie-star charisma, which almost compensates for the increasingly ridiculous plot. Malkovich and Farrell seem to understand they are A-list talent in B-movie roles, and relish the opportunity."

Box office and VOD
In Hungary, the film made $31,820 from 59 theaters in its opening weekend, finishing first at the box office. The film grossed a total of $3.3 million worldwide.

In its debut weekend in the U.S., Ava was the most rented film on Apple TV and Google Play, and second on FandangoNow. In its second weekend the film topped Apple TV, Google Play, and Spectrum, and remained second at FandangoNow. IndieWire described the performance of Ava as "the best showing for a non-premium title in the six months we’ve covered weekly VOD performance."

References

External links
 
 

2020 films
2020 action drama films
2020 action thriller films
2020 crime thriller films
2020 crime drama films
American action drama films
American action thriller films
American crime drama films
American crime thriller films
Films about contract killing
Films directed by Tate Taylor
Films produced by Dominic Rustam
Films produced by Jessica Chastain
Films produced by Kelly Carmichael
Films produced by Nicolas Chartier
Films scored by Bear McCreary
Films set in Boston
Films set in British Columbia
Films set in Normandy
Films set in Saudi Arabia
Films shot in Boston
Films with screenplays by Matthew Newton
Girls with guns films
Voltage Pictures films
2020s English-language films
2020s American films
2020s French films